Crataegus schuettei, the royal hawthorn or Schuette's hawthorn, is a species of shrubby tree in the family Rosaceae, native to northeastern North America; from Arkansas and North Carolina north to Ontario and Quebec. It is typically found growing in forest edges and old fields. Its ripe fruit is red.

Subtaxa
The following varieties are accepted:
Crataegus schuettei var. cuneata Kruschke ex J.B.Phipps – Minnesota, Wisconsin
Crataegus schuettei var. gigantea Kruschke ex J.B.Phipps – Wisconsin
Crataegus schuettei var. schuettei

References

schuettei
Flora of the Northeastern United States
Flora of Arkansas
Flora of Illinois
Flora of Kentucky
Flora of Maryland
Flora of Missouri
Flora of North Carolina
Flora of Ontario
Flora of Quebec
Flora of Virginia
Flora of Wisconsin
Plants described in 1901
Flora without expected TNC conservation status